This is a list of people executed in Tasmania. It lists people who were executed by British (and from 1901, Australian) authorities within the modern-day boundaries of Tasmania. For people executed in other parts of Australia, see the sidebar.

1800s to 1810s

Thomas England - April 1806 - Private of 102nd Regiment, hanged at Port Dalrymple for his part in theft from Government Stores at Port Dalrymple on 18 Jan 1806.
James Keating - 14 April 1806 - Hanged at Hobart for his part in theft from Government Stores at Port Dalrymple on 18 Jan 1806.
Terence Flynn - 14 July 1810 - Hanged in the Queenborough district (Sandy Bay) for murder
Job Stokes - 14 July 1810 - Hanged in the Queenborough district for housebreaking
John McCabe - 21 January 1813 - Hanged at Hobart for robbery of William Parish
John Townshend - 21 January 1813 - Hanged at Hobart for robbery of William Parish
Peter Gory - 21 January 1813 - Hanged at Hobart for robbery of William Parish
William Stephens (Steel) - 25 May 1815 - Hanged at Hobart for bushranging
Thomas Mauley - 6 June 1815 - Hanged at Hobart for murder
Richard McGuire (McGwire) - June 1815 - Hanged at Hobart for his part in the murder of William Carlisle and James O'Byrne at New Norfolk
Hugh Byrne - June or early July 1815 - Hanged at Hobart for his part in the murder of William Carlisle and James O'Byrne at New Norfolk
Richard Collyer - 26 January 1818 - Hanged on the New Town road, Hobart, for the murder in 1815 of Carlisle and O'Byrne at New Norfolk
George Gray - 11 June 1818 - Hanged at Hobart for murder of John Evans (real name Charles Bell) at York Plains
William Trimm - 11 June 1818 - Hanged at Hobart for sheep-stealing in the Richmond district

1820s

1820 to 1823

Thomas Bailey - 28 July 1820 - Hanged at Hobart for sheep stealing
John Brady - 28 July 1820 - Hanged at Hobart for sheep stealing
Robert Hunter - 28 April 1821 - Publicly hanged at scaffold erected at the top of Macquarie Street, Hobart Town, for robbery of Alfred Thrupp's property at Risdon
Edward Brady - 28 April 1821 - Hanged at Hobart for robbery of Alfred Thrupp's property at Risdon
James Flynn - 28 April 1821 - Hanged at Hobart for robbery of Alfred Thrupp's property at Risdon
Joseph Potaski - 28 April 1821 - Hanged at Hobart for robbery of Alfred Thrupp's property at Risdon
John Oliver - 28 April 1821 - Hanged at Hobart for cattle-stealing
John McGuinness – 28 April 1821 – Hanged at Hobart for sheep-stealing
Michael Riley – 28 April 1821 – Hanged at Hobart for bushranging
Thomas Kenny – 28 April 1821 – Hanged at Hobart for bushranging
John Higgins – 28 April 1821 – Hanged at Hobart for bushranging 
John Hill – 28 April 1821 – Hanged at Hobart for bushranging
John Morell – 30 May 1821 – Hanged at Launceston for stealing in the Norfolk Plains district
Daniel McCarthy – 30 May 1821 – Hanged at Launceston
Robert Gillaird – 30 May 1821 – Hanged at Launceston
William Lloyd – 30 May 1821 – Hanged at Launceston
Patrick Kane – 30 May 1821 – Hanged at Launceston
William Hyder – 3 June 1821 – Hanged at George Town for diverse robberies in the Paterson's Plains district
James Norris – 3 June 1821 – Hanged at George Town
Edward McCracken – 3 June 1821 – Hanged at George Town
Thomas Gutteridge – 3 June 1821 – Hanged at George Town for stealing at Norfolk Plains
William Smith - 25 April 1822 - Publicly hanged at the Cascade end of Macquarie Street, Hobart, for sheep stealing.
John Williams - 25 April 1822 - Publicly hanged at the Cascade end of Macquarie Street, Hobart, for sheep stealing.
James Smith – 12 April 1823 – Hanged at Hobart for sheep-stealing. (Smith actually cheated the hangman by "suspending himself by a silk handkerchief from a bar...in the room in which he was confined")
George Richardson – 14 April 1823 – Hanged at Hobart for sheep-stealing
Robert Oldham – 14 April 1823– Hanged at Hobart for sheep-stealing 
William Davis – 14 April 1823 – Hanged at Hobart for sheep-stealing 
Ralph Churlton – 14 April 1823 – Hanged at Hobart for sheep-stealing

1824 to 1825

Alexander Pearce – 19 July 1824 – Murderer and cannibal. Hanged at Hobart
Thomas Butler – 22 July 1824 – Hanged at Hobart for bushranging and robberies
Patrick Connolly – 22 July 1824 – Hanged at Hobart for bushranging and robberies
James Tierney – 22 July 1824 – Hanged at Hobart for bushranging and robberies
Isaac Walker – 22 July 1824 – Hanged at Hobart for bushranging and robberies
John Thomson – 22 July 1824 – Hanged at Hobart for bushranging and robberies
George Gardner - 8 September 1824 - Hanged at George Town for killing a steer with intent to steal 
Arthur Dicker - 8 September 1824 - Hanged at George Town for killing a steer with intent to steal 
Thomas Taylor - 8 September 1824 - Hanged at George Town for the murder of John Street at Abbotsfield
Luke Fowler - 8 September 1824 - Hanged at George Town for the murder of John Street at Abbotsfield
Charles Kimberley - 8 September 1824 - Hanged at George Town for the murder of Judith Burke
James Crawford - 8 September 1824 - Hanged at George Town for robbery and putting in fear
John Bimms - 8 September 1824 - Hanged at George Town for robbery and putting in fear
Job Corfield – 8 September 1824 – Hanged at George Town for robbery and putting in fear
Matthew Stephenson - 15 September 1824 - Hanged at George Town for robbery and putting in fear
John Twiggs - 15 September 1824 - Hanged at George Town for robbery and putting in fear
Thomas Hudson – 28 January 1825 – Hanged at Macquarie Harbour for the murder of Robert Esk
Richard Allen – 28 January 1825 - Hanged at Macquarie Harbour for the murder of William Saul at Birch's Bay
Francis Oates – 28 January 1825 - Hanged at Macquarie Harbour for the murder of James Williamson
Henry McConnell – 25 February 1825 – Hanged at Hobart for robbery
Jeremiah Ryan – 25 February 1825 – Hanged at Hobart for murder and robbery
Charles Ryder – 25 February 1825 – Hanged at Hobart for murder and robbery
James Bryant – 25 February 1825 – Hanged at Hobart for murder and robbery
Black Jack (or Jack Roberts) – 25 February 1825 – Indigenous. Hanged at Hobart for the murder of Patrick McCarthy
Musquito – 25 February 1825 – Indigenous (Eora). Hanged at Hobart for a murder at Grindstone Bay
Peter Thackery – 25 February 1825 – Hanged at Hobart for bushranging and robbery
John Logan – 25 February 1825 – Hanged at Hobart for attempted shooting murder of William Shoobridge. The victim was saved because the bullet struck a ruler in his pocket.
Samuel Fielding – 26 February 1825 – Hanged at Hobart for sheep-stealing
James Chamberlain – 26 February 1825 – Hanged at Hobart for sheep-stealing
Stephen Lear – 26 February 1825 – Hanged at Hobart for burglary at the Surveyor-General's
Henry Fry – 26 February 1825 – Hanged at Hobart for burglary at the Surveyor-General's 
John Reid Riddel – 31 August 1825 – Hanged at Hobart for murder of George Fildes in Goulburn St. He confessed to the murder of both his ex-wives.
Thomas Peacock – 31 August 1825 – Hanged at Hobart for murder of Constable Craggs 
William Buckley – 31 August 1825 – Hanged at Hobart for bushranging and robbery
Joseph Broadhead – 31 August 1825 – Hanged at Hobart for bushranging and robbery
John Everiss – 31 August 1825 – Hanged at Hobart for bushranging and robbery
John Godliman – 7 September 1825 – Hanged at Hobart for the murder of Samuel Hunt at Fourteen-Tree Plain, near Jericho.
Jonas Dobson – 12 December 1825 – Hanged at Hobart for murder of his overseer

1826
John Johnson –  6 January 1826 - Hanged at Hobart for burglary at Mr. Barnes' 
Samuel Longman – 6 January 1826 – Hanged at Hobart for burglary
Charles Wigley – 6 January 1826 – Hanged at Hobart for burglary
James Major – 6 January 1826 – Hanged at Hobart for stealing an ox
William Pollock – 6 January 1826 – Hanged at Hobart for sheep-stealing
George Harden – 6 January 1826 – Hanged at Hobart for sheep-stealing
William Preece – 6 January 1826 – Hanged at Hobart for robberies and bushranging
James McCabe – 7 January 1826 – Hanged at Hobart for murder, robberies and bushranging
Richard Brown – 7 January 1826 – Hanged at Hobart for sheep-stealing
James Brown – 7 January 1826 – Hanged at Hobart for sheep-stealing
John Green – 7 January 1826 – Hanged at Hobart for sheep-stealing
Thomas Bosworth – 7 January 1826 – Hanged at Hobart for stealing a boat
Richard Miller – 7 January 1826 – Hanged at Hobart for stealing a boat
Richard Craven – 7 January 1826 – Hanged at Hobart for stealing a boat
James Eales – 17 February 1826 – Hanged at Hobart for sheep-stealing and robbery
William Eales – 17 February 1826 – Hanged at Hobart for sheep-stealing and robbery
Matthew Brady – 4 May 1826 – Hanged at Hobart for Murder, robberies and bushranging
Patrick Bryant – 4 May 1826 – Hanged at Hobart for Murder, robberies and bushranging
Thomas Jeffrey – 4 May 1826 – Hanged at Hobart for Murder, robberies and bushranging
John Perry – 4 May 1826 – Hanged at Hobart for Murder, robberies and bushranging
John Thompson – 4 May 1826 – Hanged at Hobart for the murder of Margaret Smith at the Watch-House
Samuel Hodgetts – 5 May 1826 – Hanged at Hobart for Murder, robberies and bushranging
James McKenney – 5 May 1826 – Hanged at Hobart for Murder, robberies and bushranging
James Goodwin – 5 May 1826 – Hanged at Hobart for Murder, robberies and bushranging
John Gregory – 5 May 1826 – Hanged at Hobart for Murder, robberies and bushranging
William Tilley – 5 May 1826 – Hanged at Hobart for Murder, robberies and bushranging
William Brown – 5 May 1826 – Hanged at Hobart for Murder, robberies and bushranging
Thomas Dunnings – 13 September 1826 – Hanged at Hobart for the murder of Alexander Simpson at Pittwater
Edward Everett – 13 September 1826 – Hanged at Hobart for the murder of Alexander Simpson at Pittwater
William Smith – 13 September 1826 – Hanged at Hobart for the murder of Alexander Simpson at Pittwater
John Taylor – 13 September 1826 – Hanged at Hobart for absconding from Macquarie Harbour and robbing soldiers of their arms
George Watters – 13 September 1826 – Hanged at Hobart for absconding from Macquarie Harbour and robbing soldiers of their arms 
Jack – 13 September 1826 – Indigenous. Hanged for the murder of Thomas Colley at Oyster Bay. Jack was kept apart before the execution as he was suffering from leprosy.
Dick – 13 September 1826 – Indigenous. Hanged for the murder of Thomas Colley at Oyster Bay
George Brace – 15 September 1826 – Hanged at Hobart for robbery and bushranging
John McFarlane – 15 September 1826 – Hanged at Hobart for absconding into the woods and robbing William Holdship at Browns River
James Edwards – 15 September 1826 – Hanged at Hobart for absconding into the woods and robbing William Holdship at Browns River
Thomas Balfour – 15 September 1826 – Hanged at Hobart for absconding into the woods and robbing William Holdship at Browns River
John Dadd – 15 September 1826 – Hanged at Hobart for burglary at Ross
John Clark – 15 September 1826 – Hanged at Hobart for burglary at Ross
Patrick Brown – 15 September 1826 – Hanged at Hobart for sheep-stealing
John Pearson (Penson) – 18 September 1826 – Hanged at Hobart for burglary from Richard Worley, butcher, Elizabeth St
James Rowles – 18 September 1826 – Hanged at Hobart for robbing his employer John Dunn's shop, Elizabeth St
Timothy Swinscow – 18 September 1826 – Hanged at Hobart for robbing Mrs. Till at New Norfolk
William Wickens – 18 September 1826 – Hanged at Hobart for robbing Mrs. Till at New Norfolk
George Farquharson – 18 September 1826 – Hanged at Hobart for sheep-stealing at Jericho
Robert Cable – 18 September 1826 – Hanged at Hobart for sheep-stealing from the Sherwin flock on the Clyde
Thomas Savell – 18 September 1826 – Hanged at Hobart for sheep-stealing from David Lord in the Pitt Water district
John Davis – 18 September 1826 – Hanged at Hobart for sheep-stealing from David Lord in the Pitt Water district
John Cruitt – 18 September 1826 – Hanged at Hobart for sheep-stealing from David Lord in the Pitt Water district

1827

Robert Grant - 8 January 1827 - Hanged at Hobart for sheep stealing from Edmund Bryant near Jericho
George Bentley - 8 January 1827 - Hanged at Hobart for sheep stealing from Edmund Bryant near Jericho
William Crest - 8 January 1827 - Hanged at Hobart for sheep stealing from Edmund Bryant near Jericho
William Evans - 8 January 1827 - Hanged at Hobart for assault and robbery at New Town of John Sayers 'the broom-maker'.
Peter Rice - 8 January 1827 - Hanged at Hobart for shooting at John Swift in Murray Street, Hobart
Patrick Dunne - 8 January 1827 - Bushranger. Hanged at Hobart for armed robbery at Kingston
Charles Burgh - 9 January 1827 - Hanged at Hobart for horse stealing
Henry Strong - 9 January 1827 - Hanged at Hobart for escaping, bushranging and robbery
Michael Brown - 9 January 1827 - Hanged at Hobart for escaping, bushranging and robbery
George Ellis - 9 January 1827 - Hanged at Hobart for escaping, bushranging and robbery
William Birt - 9 January 1827 - Hanged at Hobart for escaping, bushranging and robbery
William Hoadley - 9 January 1827 - Hanged at Hobart for escaping, bushranging and robbery
William Tuffnell - 19 February 1827 - Hanged at Launceston for the rape of nine-year-old Ellen Briggs
Richard Gill - 19 February 1827 - Hanged at Launceston for burglary
Edward Howe - 19 February 1827 - Hanged at Launceston for highway robbery near Scottsdale
Joseph Horsefield - 19 February 1827 - Hanged at Launceston for burglary
James Gurd - 19 February 1827 - Hanged at Launceston for burglary in the Norfolk Plains district
William Ashford - 19 February 1827 - Hanged at Launceston for burglary in the Norfolk Plains district
Andrew Winchester - 19 February 1827 - Hanged at Launceston for burglary in the Macquarie River district
William Haywood - 19 February 1827 - Hanged at Launceston for the murder of Christopher McRae at Lake River 
Henry Oakley – 3 July 1827 - Hanged at Hobart for burglary from Mr Brodie on the Clyde
Thomas Bidwell Child – 3 July 1827 – Hanged at Hobart for forgery
John Wright – 3 July 1827 – Hanged at Hobart for robbery at Old Beach
John Clayton – 3 July 1827 – Hanged at Hobart for sheep-stealing
George Dunning – 3 July 1827 – Hanged at Hobart for sheep-stealing
William Longhurst – 3 July 1827 – Hanged at Hobart for sheep-stealing
Daniel McPherson – 3 July 1827 – Hanged at Hobart for burglary of the home of Henry Bye, North Hobart
Martin Higgins – 3 July 1827 – Hanged at Hobart for "stealing in a dwelling house at noon-day" from Henry Bye, North Hobart
James Horsefield - 23 August 1827 - Bushranger. Hanged at Hobart for armed robbery at Stanfield's, Ralph's Bay
George Metcalfe - 23 August 1827 - Bushranger. Hanged at Hobart for armed robbery at Stanfield's, Ralph's Bay
James Coates - 23 August 1827 - Bushranger. Hanged at Hobart for armed robbery at Stanfield's, Ralph's Bay
John Brown (the Mariner) - 23 August 1827 - Bushranger. Hanged at Hobart for armed robbery at Stanfield's, Ralph's Bay
John Lee - 23 August 1827 - Bushranger. Hanged at Hobart for armed robbery at Stanfield's, Ralph's Bay
George Braithwaite - 23 August 1827 - Bushranger. Hanged at Hobart for armed robbery at Stanfield's, Ralph's Bay
John Brown (the Bricklayer) - 23 August 1827 - Bushranger. Hanged at Hobart for armed robbery at Stanfield's, Ralph's Bay
Thomas Davis (real name Roberts) - 23 August 1827 - Bushranger. Hanged at Hobart for armed robbery at Stanfield's, Ralph's Bay
Matthew McCullum - 23 August 1827 - Bushranger. Hanged at Hobart for armed robbery at Stanfield's, Ralph's Bay
Humphrey Oulton - 15 November 1827 - Hanged at Launceston for the theft of a sheep
Abraham Abrahams - 15 November 1827 - Hanged at Launceston for the theft of a mare from the Gourlay property on the Clyde
William Shepherd - 15 November 1827 - Hanged at Launceston for burglary from the home of Ralph Compton on the Norfolk Plains (Longford)
George Lacey - 17 December 1827 - Hanged at Hobart for murder of Constable George Rex at Macquarie Harbour
John Ward ("Flash Jack") - 17 December 1827 - Hanged at Hobart for his role in the Rex murder
Samuel Measures - 17 December 1827 - Hanged at Hobart for his role in the Rex murder
William Jenkins - 17 December 1827 - Hanged at Hobart for his role in the Rex murder
James Conhope - 17 December 1827 - Hanged at Hobart for the rape of a six-year-old (convict per Minerva)
James Reid - 17 December 1827 - Hanged at Hobart for his role in the Rex murder
Thomas Williams - 17 December 1827 - Hanged at Hobart for his role in the Rex murder
James Kirk - 17 December 1827 - Hanged at Hobart for his role in the Rex murder
John McMillan - 17 December 1827- Hanged at Hobart for his role in the Rex murder
John Maguire - 17 December 1827 - Hanged at Hobart for his role in the Rex murder

1828 to 1829

George Driver - 30 January 1828 - Hanged at Hobart for the murder of John Onely at Macquarie Harbour
Samuel Higgins  - 30 January 1828 - Hanged at Hobart for the murder of John Onely at Macquarie Harbour
William Fowler - 1 March 1828 - Hanged at Hobart for the murder of a little girl named Emma Groom
Henry Williamson - 1 March 1828 - Hanged at Hobart for the murder of Malcolm Logan at Green Ponds (Kempton)
Thomas Pearson - 26 May 1828 - Hanged at Hobart for bushranging and burglary at Cross Marsh (Melton Mowbray)
Phelim Bonner (real name Crampsey) - 26 May 1828 - Hanged at Hobart for assault and robbery on James Collins
Edward Hangan - 26 May 1828 - Hanged at Hobart for robbery of a gun from James McLanachan
John Grimes - 26 May 1828 - Hanged at Hobart for shooting with intent at George Marshall near Sorell
Thomas Collins - 26 May 1828 - Hanged at Hobart for burglary at the home of George Cartwright
Edward Burke - 26 May 1828 - Hanged at Hobart for robbery
Abraham Aaron - 1 August 1828 - Hanged at Hobart for robbery at Maria Island 
Philip Large - 15 February 1829 - Hanged at Launceston for the rape of eleven year-old Margaret Stewart
John Morrison - 15 February 1829 - Hanged at Launceston for arson
John Gibson - 15 February 1829 - Hanged at Launceston for robbery
Charles Williams - 15 February 1829 - Hanged at Launceston for armed robbery
William Ashton - 15 February 1829 - Hanged at Launceston for robbery
Joseph Moulds - 15 February 1829 - Hanged at Launceston for robbery
William Baker - 15 February 1829 - Hanged at Launceston for robbery
John Baker - 17 Feb 1829 - Hanged at Launceston for sheep stealing
Bernard Shields - 17 Feb 1829 - Hanged at Launceston for sheep stealing (convict per Minerva) 
Daniel Mackie - 17 Feb 1829 - Hanged at Launceston for sheep stealing
Daniel Leary - 17 Feb 1829 - Hanged at Launceston for bullock stealing
Thomas Rogers - 17 Feb 1829 - Hanged at Launceston for burglary
George Palmer - 17 Feb 1829 - Hanged at Launceston for armed robbery
Daniel Brown - 2 March 1829 - Hanged at Hobart for murder of a fellow-convict named Stopford at Macquarie Harbour
John Salmon - 2 March 1829 - Hanged at Hobart for murder of a fellow-convict named Stopford at Macquarie Harbour
John Leach - 7 March 1829 - Hanged at Hobart for the murder of his common-law wife
Robert Bourke - 12 July 1829 - Hanged at Hobart for escaping and stealing a boat at Macquarie Harbour
William Madden - 12 July 1829 - Hanged at Hobart for armed robbery
William Herring - 12 July 1829 - Hanged at Hobart for escaping and stealing a boat at Macquarie Harbour

1830s

1830 to 1831

John Mayo – 11 January 1830 – Hanged at Hobart Gaol for the murder of James Bailey at Macquarie Harbour
William Wilkes - 23 January 1830 - Hanged at Hobart for the murder of Dennis Alcoloret on Bruny Island in Oct 1827
Hugh Campbell – 3 February 1830 – Soldier of the 63rd Regiment, hanged at Hobart for the murder of Jonathan Brett
Michael Best - 11 February 1830 - Hanged at Hobart for the murder of Richard Garner at Hamilton
John Oxley – 24 February 1830 – Hanged at Hobart for the murder of Susan Corfield
Samuel Killen – 26 February 1830 – Hanged at Hobart for sheep stealing
John Jones – 26 February 1830 – Hanged at Hobart for sheep stealing
Joseph Fogg – 26 February 1830 – Hanged at Hobart for an unnatural crime
Thomas Goodwin – 26 February 1830 – Hanged at Hobart for cutting the throat of Ann Hamilton with intent to kill
Mary McLauchlan – 19 April 1830 – Hanged at Hobart for the murder of her infant son. The first woman executed in Van Diemen's Land/Tasmania.
Edmund Daniels - 14 May 1830 - Hanged at Hobart for bushranging. (Convict, Asia 3rd) 
John Dighton - 14 May 1830 - Hanged at Hobart for bushranging. (Convict - Earl St Vincent) 
James Child - 14 May 1830 - Hanged at Hobart for bushranging. (Convict - Chapman 2nd) 
Andrew Bates - 14 May 1830 - Hanged at Hobart for bushranging. (Convict - Phoenix) 
Edward Ladywig - 14 May 1830 - Hanged at Hobart for robbery (Convict - Phoenix) 
Joseph Ellis - 14 May 1830 - Hanged at Hobart for sheep stealing (Convict - Dromedary) 
Andrew McCue - 14 May 1830 - Hanged at Hobart for burglary of clothing and money from the house of John Robins
George Thomson – 17 May 1830 - Hanged at Hobart for housebreaking, theft of silver plate and two pistols (Convict - Lady Harewood) 
Edward Sweeney – 30 June 1830 – Hanged at Launceston for the murder of his wife Mary Sweeney
William Thomas – 30 June 1830 – Hanged at Launceston for the murder of John 'Smutty Jack' Warne
William Messenger - 10 July 1830 - Hanged at Launceston for the rape of a five-year-old child
John Brady - 10 July 1830 - Hanged at Launceston for the rape of a five-year-old child
Richard Udall - 10 July 1830 - Hanged at Launceston for the rape of a five-year-old child
Charles Routley - 17 September 1830 - Hanged at Hobart for the murder of John "Pretty Jack"  Buckley at Carlton River
Henry Strong - 9 January 1831 - Bushranger. Hanged at Hobart for armed robbery at the property of James Reid on the Macquarie River
William Hoadley - 9 January 1831 - Bushranger. Hanged at Hobart for armed robbery at the property of James Reid on the Macquarie River
Michael Brown - 9 January 1831 - Bushranger. Hanged at Hobart for armed robbery at the property of James Reid on the Macquarie River
William Birt - 9 January 1831 - Bushranger. Hanged at Hobart for armed robbery at the property of James Reid on the Macquarie River
George Ellis - 9 January 1831 - Bushranger. Hanged at Hobart for armed robbery at the property of James Reid on the Macquarie River
Charles Burgh (alias Sutton) - 9 January 1831 - Hanged at Hobart for the theft of a horse from Captain Andrew Barclay near Launceston
Edward Broughton (28) - 5 August 1831- Hanged at Hobart for absconding from Macquarie Harbour; while on the run he had murdered and cannibalised William Coventry and two others
Matthew Macavoy - 5 August 1831 - Hanged at Hobart for absconding from Macquarie Harbour; while on the run he had murdered and cannibalised William Coventry and two others
John Somers - 23 December 1831 - Hanged at Hobart for rape

1832 to 1834

James Camm – 30 April 1832 – Hanged at Hobart for piracy; he was involved in the Cyprus mutiny in 1829
James Metcalfe – 30 April 1832 - Hanged at Hobart for assault of John Munn
Robert Gordon – 30 April 1832 – Hanged at Hobart for burglary
John Gow - 14 May 1832 - Hanged at Hobart for the shooting murder of Patrick Carrigan, a soldier of the 63rd
Joseph Colvin - 14 May 1832 - Hanged at Hobart for aiding and abetting the murder of Patrick Carrigan
Elijah Alder - 16 March 1832 - Hanged at Hobart for the murder of Benjamin Horne at Ross
John Towers – 5 June 1832 – Hanged at Hobart for the murder of two hawkers named Patrick Fitzgibbon and John Kellerman on the St Paul's Plains
James Fletcher – 5 June 1832 – Hanged at Hobart for the murder of Patrick Fitzgibbon and John Kellerman on the St Paul's Plains
Thomas Fleet – 17 October 1832 - Hanged at Hobart for the attempted axe murder of William Waring Saxton at Port Arthur
William Evans – 17 October 1832 - Hanged at Hobart for the attempted knife murder of George Edwards at Granton
William Higham - 5 January 1833 - Bushranger. Hanged at Hobart for armed robberies in the Ross area
Simon Gowan (Going) - 5 January 1833 - Hanged at Hobart for the rape of eight-year-old Mary Ann Bowman at Jericho
John Glover - 5 January 1833 - Hanged at Hobart for the rape of eight-year-old Mary Ann Bowman at Jericho
Robert Dutchess - 5 January 1833 - Hanged at Hobart for bestiality with a mare
John Clements ('Jack the Lagger') - 5 January 1833 - Bushranger. Hanged at Hobart for armed robbery and putting in fear
Richard (John) Jones - 15 April 1833 - Hanged at Hobart for bestiality on board the Circassian
Thomas Ansell – 1 November 1833 – Hanged at Hobart for robbery
Jonathan Dark - 1 November 1833 - Hanged at Hobart for burglary in Argyle St
William Ward – 10 March 1834  – Hanged at Launceston for burglary
Samuel Newman – 10 March 1834 – Hanged at Launceston for burglary
Thomas Dawson – 10 March 1834 – Hanged at Launceston for burglary
Joseph Deane – 26 March 1834 – Bushranger. Hanged at Hobart for robbery at Green Ponds (Kempton)
Henry Rutland – 26 March 1834 – Bushranger. Hanged at Hobart for robbery at Green Ponds (Kempton)
Samuel (a 'man of colour') – 26 March 1834 – Hanged at Hobart for the attempted murder at Port Arthur of Chief Constable Richard Newman
Joseph Greenwood – 16 April 1834 – Hanged at Hobart for the attempted murder of Constable Thomas Terry at New Town racecourse. 
Benjamin Davidson - 17 June 1834 - Hanged at Hobart for the murder of Ann Howell at Norfolk Plains (Longford)
William Hurlock (Hislop) - 17 June 1834 - Hanged at Hobart for aiding and abetting the murder of Ann Howell
Henry Street - 17 June 1834 - Hanged at Hobart for aiding and abetting the murder of Ann Howell

1835 to 1839

John Burke – 13 February 1835 – Hanged at Hobart for burglary at Ross
William Weston – 13 February 1835 – Hanged at Hobart for burglary at Ross
John Ashton – 13 February 1835 – Hanged at Hobart for burglary at Ross
Thomas Kirkham – 13 February 1835 – Hanged at Hobart for burglary at Ross
John Dunn - 11 August 1835 - Hanged at Hobart for armed robbery of William Evans at Lemon Springs, near Oatlands
George Clarke - 11 August 1835 - Hanged at Hobart for armed robbery of William Evans at Lemon Springs, near Oatlands
Samuel Hibbill (Hibbell) - 10 March 1836 - Hanged at Hobart for the murder of Capt. Sibson Bragg, by throwing him overboard the schooner Industry in the Tasman Sea
Thomas Harris - 10 March 1836 - Hanged at Hobart for the murder of Capt. Sibson Bragg, by throwing him overboard the schooner Industry in the Tasman Sea
Robert Smith - 10 March 1836 - Hanged at Hobart for the murder of Capt. Sibson Bragg, by throwing him overboard the schooner Industry in the Tasman Sea
Samuel Guillem - 16 March 1837 - Hanged at Hobart for the murder of Mary Mills at New Norfolk
John McKay – first five days of May 1837 – Hanged at Hobart for the 1 April 1837 murder of Joseph Edward Wilson near Perth. His corpse was later gibbeted at Perth.
John Gardiner – 10 November 1837 – Hanged at Launceston Gaol for the murder of George Mogg on the Tamar
John Hudson – 10 November 1837 – Hanged at Launceston for cutting and maiming with intent to murder Isaac Schofield, the overseer of a chain-gang
James Hawes – 10 November 1837 - Hanged at Launceston for burglary and assault on Valentine Soper at Windmill Hill, Launceston
Henry Stewart – 10 November 1837 - Hanged at Launceston for burglary and assault on Valentine Soper at Windmill Hill, Launceston
James Atterall - 21 June 1838 - Hanged at Hobart for the armed robbery of Vincent's Hotel, Epping Forest
James Regan - 21 June 1838 - Hanged at Hobart for the armed robbery of Vincent's Hotel, Epping Forest
Anthony Banks - 21 June 1838 - Hanged at Hobart for the armed robbery of Vincent's Hotel, Epping Forest. Banks was the first native-born Vandemonian executed in the colony

1840s

1840 to 1844

John Riley - 8 June 1840 - Hanged at Hobart for the murder of James Matthews in Warwick St. Hobart
John Davis - 8 June 1840 - Hanged at Hobart for the murder of James Matthews in Warwick St. Hobart
George Pettit - 8 June 1840 - Hanged at Hobart for the murder of John Paul at York Plains
John Martin - 8 June 1840 - Hanged at Hobart for the attempted murder of Sergeant George Newman (of the 51st) on board the government brig Tamar
John Watson - 30 January 1841 - Bushranger. Hanged at Launceston for the armed robbery of John Holding at Ashby, near Ross
Patrick Wallace - 30 January 1841 - Bushranger. Hanged at Launceston for the armed robbery of John Holding at Ashby, near Ross. Wallace and Watson were hangman Solomon Blay's first executions.
Joseph Broom - 19 February 1841 - Hanged at Hobart for armed robbery of Joseph Bailey near Campbell Town
James McKay - 27 May 1841 - Hanged at Hobart for the murder of William Trusson at the Great Lake
William Hill - 27 May 1841 - Hanged at Hobart for the murder of William Trusson at the Great Lake
Patrick Minnighan - 25 June 1841 - Hanged at Hobart for the murder of James Travers at Port Arthur
Edward Allen - 31 July 1841 - Hanged at Launceston for the murder of Samuel Brewell at Muddy Creek, on the west bank of the Tamar
Thomas Dooner - 6 August 1841 - Hanged at Hobart for the armed robbery of Joseph Walker at a hut on the Macquarie River
James Broomfield - 25 October 1841 - Bushranger. Hanged at Launceston for armed robbery at Tarleton
James Williamson - 4 January 1842 - Hanged at Hobart for the murder of Thomas Lord at Swanport (Swansea)
George Bailey - 4 January 1842 - Hanged at Hobart for the murder of Thomas Lord at Swanport (Swansea)
Henry Belfield - 20 January 1842 - Hanged at Hobart for the murder of Thomas Broadman at Port Arthur
Elijah Ainsworth - 6 June 1842 - Hanged at Hobart for the rape of five-year-old Mary Jeffery 
Thomas Turner - 9 June 1842 - Hanged at Hobart for the murder of his wife Hannah at Moonah
William Langham - 10 August 1842 - Hanged at Hobart for the attempted murder of the Doctor at Port Arthur and the stabbing of a boy named Thomas Cooke
Samuel Williams - 27 December 1842 - Hanged at Hobart for the murder of James Harkness at Port Arthur
James Littleton - 27 December 1842 - Hanged at Hobart for the murder of Henry Seaton at Broadmarsh
Henry Smith - 11 May 1843 - Hanged at Hobart for the murder of Henry Childs (Childe) at Sandy Bay
James Bowtell - 16 May 1843 - Hanged at Hobart for the armed robbery of William Marks on the highway at Dysart
Riley Jeffs – 26 July 1843 – Bushranger. Publicly hanged at Launceston for the murder of District Constable William Ward at Campbell Town
John Conway – 26 July 1843 – Bushranger. Publicly hanged at Launceston for the murder of District Constable William Ward at Campbell Town
John Woolley – 5 April 1844 – Hanged at Hobart for robbery and attempting to kill special constable William Hobart Wells
George Churchward – 5 April 1844 – Hanged at Hobart for robbery
William Thomas – 5 April 1844 – Hanged at Hobart for robbery
George Bristol – 5 April 1844 – Hanged at Hobart for robbery
John Walker – 5 April 1844 – Hanged at Hobart for robbery
Alexander Reid - 24 April 1844 – Hanged at Oatlands for shooting and wounding Constable Murray
Thomas Marshall – 24 April 1844 – Hanged At Oatlands for the murder of Ben Smith
George Jones – 30 April 1844 – Hanged at Hobart for armed robbery 
James Platt – 30 April 1844 – Hanged at Hobart for armed robbery
Isaac Tidburrow (Tidbury) - 9 July 1844 - Hanged at Hobart for the rape of seven-year-old Mary-Ann Gangell
Thomas Wicksett - 9 July 1844 - Hanged at Hobart for the murder of John Ayres at Port Arthur
James Gannon - 7 August 1844 - Hanged at Hobart for a rape committed near Richmond
Thomas Smith - 7 August 1844 - Hanged at Hobart for the attempted murder of overseer William Perry at Port Arthur
James Boyle - 7 August 1844 - Hanged at Hobart for the attempted murder of overseer William Perry at Port Arthur

1845 to 1849

Richard Jackson - 1 May 1845 - Hanged at Oatlands for the rape of Elizabeth Davis
Anthony Kedge - 8 August 1845 - Hanged at Launceston for the murder of Charles Shepherd between George Town and Low Head
Francis Maxfield - 12 August 1845 - Hanged at Hobart for the attempted murder of sub-overseer Joseph Ellis at Port Arthur
Thomas Gomm – 23 September 1845 – Hanged at Hobart for his part in the murder of Jane Saunders at New Norfolk
William Taylor - 23 September 1845 – Hanged at Hobart for his part in the murder of Jane Saunders at New Norfolk
Isaac Lockwood – 23 September 1845 – Hanged at Hobart for his part in the murder of Jane Saunders at New Norfolk
Eliza Benwell – 2 October 1845 – Hanged at Hobart for aiding and abetting the murder of Jane Saunders at New Norfolk
Thomas Gillan - 1 November 1845 - Hanged at Launceston for armed robbery at Breadalbane (Cocked Hat)
Michael Keegan (Keogan) - 31 December 1845 - Hanged at Hobart for attempted murder of sub-overseer Joseph Ellis at Port Arthur
Job Harris - 31 December 1845 - Hanged at Hobart for his involvement in the pack-rape of a fellow-convict at the Coal Mines, Saltwater River
William Collier - 31 December 1845 - Hanged at Hobart for his involvement in the pack-rape of a fellow-convict at the Coal Mines, Saltwater River
John Phillips – 4 February 1846 – Hanged at Oatlands for setting fire to the magistrate's oatstacks following a conviction for sly grog selling
Daniel McCabe - 24 March 1846 - Hanged at Hobart for cutting and wounding, with intent to kill, Francis Scott at Impression Bay
Charles Woodman - 24 March 1846 - Hanged at Hobart for assault and attempted murder of Elizabeth Jones in Davey Street
Henry Food - 28 April 1846 - Hanged at Launceston for the armed robbery of Revd Dr Browne
Henry Cooper - 13 May 1846 - Hanged at Hobart for the attempted murder of Richard Beech at Impression Bay
Michael Roach - 24 September 1846 - Hanged at Hobart for wounding with intent to murder catechist Roger Boyle at Port Arthur
Michael Lyons - 11 November 1846 - Hanged at Hobart for committing an 'unnatural crime' with a goat at Port Cygnet
Peter Kenny - 24 March 1847 - Hanged at Hobart for the attempted murder of James Goodall Francis at Battery Point. Kenny, a former Point Puer boy, attacked Francis with a tomahawk while attempting burglary. Francis went on to become Premier of Victoria twenty-five years later
William Bennett - 24 March 1847 - Hanged at Hobart for the murder of fellow-prisoner Thomas Shand at Port Arthur
George Wood - 29 June 1847 - Hanged at Hobart for the murder of William Taylor at Port Arthur
Charles Benwell – 14 September 1847 – Hanged at Hobart for murder of George Lowe near Bagdad. He was the brother of Eliza Benwell, hanged in 1845.
Laban Gower - 23 November 1847 - Hanged at Hobart for the attempted murder of Ann Mayfield at Old Beach
Hugh Glacken – 25 November 1847 – Hanged at Launceston for bushranging
James Hill - 4 January 1848 - Hanged at Hobart for the murder of an elderly lady named Alice Martin at Brighton
Henry Whelan - 4 January 1848 - Hanged at Hobart for the murder of Robert Mann at Berriedale
James Kennedy - 4 January 1848 - Hanged at Hobart for the attempted murder of William Millar at Port Arthur
James Connolly - 22 February 1848 - Publicly hanged at Hobart for arson (setting a barn on fire) at Impression Bay. 
Nathaniel Westerman (Weston) - 4 April 1848 - Hanged at Hobart for the murder of fellow-prisoner Joseph Blundell at Port Arthur
James Sullivan – 9 May 1848 – Hanged at Oatlands for the attempted murder of Constable James Kelly at Swanston, near Andover
Patrick Shea – 9 May 1848 – Hanged at Oatlands for the attempted murder of Constable James Kelly at Swanston
James McGough – 9 May 1848 – Hanged at Oatlands for the attempted murder of Constable James Kelly at Swanston
John Shale – 9 May 1848 - Hanged at Oatlands for wounding John Connell with intent to murder
Thomas Smith – 4 August 1848 – Hanged at Oatlands for stabbing with intent to murder Constable Clough at Jericho
Jeremiah Maher – 4 August 1848 – Hanged at Oatlands for stabbing with intent to murder Constable Clough at Jericho
Thomas Liner – 8 August 1848 - Hanged at Hobart for the stabbing murder of Hugh Gilmore in Kelly St
John Jordan – 7 November 1848 – Hanged at Launceston for the murder of Zimran Youram at Norfolk Plains
Matthew Mahide – 7 November 1848 – Hanged at Launceston for armed robbery at Snake Banks (present-day Powranna)
Michael Rogers- 3 January 1849 - Bushranger. Hanged at Hobart for the murder of Joseph Howard at Port Sorell
William Stamford - 3 January 1849 - Hanged at Hobart for the armed robbery of Thomas Lovell at Brushy Plains (Runnymede)
John Russell Dickers - 20 March 1849 - Hanged at Hobart for attempted murder of Constable Samuel Withers on the corner of Fitzroy Crescent and Davey St, South Hobart
James Holloway - 25 June 1849 - Bushranger. Hanged at Hobart for armed robbery of Edwin Beckett at Prosser's Plains (present-day Buckland)
John Stevens – 24 July 1849 – Hanged at Launceston for the murder of Margaret Buttery at Longford
James McKechnie - 31 December 1849 - Hanged at Hobart for the murder of Francis Sockett in Davey St, Hobart

1850s

1850 to 1854

John King - 21 March 1850 - Hanged at Hobart for attempted murder of Alexander Smith at Port Arthur
James Howarth - 21 March 1850 - Hanged at Hobart for the attempted murder of Joshua Jennings at New Town
James Mullay - 26 July 1850 - Hanged at Launceston for the murder of fellow-constable John McNamara at Perth
Joseph Squires - 26 July 1850 - Hanged at Launceston for the rape of four-year-old Horatio James
Christopher Hollis - 24 September 1850 - Hanged at Hobart for the murder of Thomas Couchman at Bridgewater
John Woods - 6 November 1850 - Hanged at Hobart for the murder of Constable Bernard Mulholland at Franklin
Joseph Brewer - 11 February 1851 - Hanged at Hobart for the murder of Ann Hefford at Campbell Town
Thomas Burrows - 13 February 1851 - Hanged at Launceston for the armed robbery of Thomas Parsons at Nile
William Parker - 13 February 1851 - Hanged at Launceston for the armed robbery of Thomas Parsons at Nile
Henry Hart - 13 February 1851 - Hanged at Launceston for the attempted murder of Harriet Grubb at Cressy
Thomas Dalton - 21 March 1851 - Bushranger. Hanged at Hobart for highway robbery of William Corrigan at Constitution Hill
William Henry Stevens - 25 April 1851 - Convict. Hanged at Oatlands for Assaulting James Moore, being armed with a gun on the high road between Antill Ponds and Tunbridge
Buchanan Wilson - 3 May 1851 - Hanged at Hobart for the armed robbery of Patrick Cooney on the Huon Road, two miles out of Hobart
George Mackie – 21 July 1851 – Hanged at Oatlands for the murder of Thomas Gilbert at Waters Meeting, near Cranbrook
John Crisp – 27 October 1851 – Hanged at Oatlands for Wounding with Intent Constable William Donohoo at Swansea
Francis Duke – 31 October 1851 – Hanged at Launceston for the murder of William Smith at Fern Tree Hill, near Deloraine
James Yardley – 31 October 1851 – Hanged at Launceston for attempted murder of Robert Hudson at Deloraine
William Henry Stephens – 25 April 1851 – Hanged at Oatlands for the attempted murder of Thomas Moore at Antill Ponds
Thomas Callaghan (Callaher, Gallagher, Collahon, Collohan, Callahan) - 6 October 1851 - Hanged at Hobart for the rape of Ann Curtis at Grasstree Hill
Michael Conlan - 22 December 1851 - Hanged at Hobart for the murder of Francis Burt at Franklin
Patrick Callaghan - 22 December 1851 - Hanged at Hobart for the murder of Francis Burt at Franklin
William Porter - 29 December 1851 - Hanged at Hobart for the attempted murder of William Andrews at Sandy Bay
Charles Lockwood - 28 January 1852 - Hanged at Launceston for the attempted murder of William Gaffney at Longford
John Castles - 22 June 1852 - Hanged at Hobart for the murder of William Hibbard at Kangaroo Point
Mary Sullivan - 5 August 1852 - Hanged at Hobart for the murder of two-year-old Clara Adeline Fraser in Campbell St. Sullivan was sixteen when she went to the gallows.
Patrick McMahon – 28 October 1852 – Hanged at Oatlands for rape of a child
John Kilburn - 11 February 1853 - Hanged at Hobart for attempted murder of overseer Charles Weatherall at Pittwater
John Wood - 11 February 1853 - Hanged at Hobart for the murder of Kate Toole in Goulburn St
James Dalton – 26 April 1853 – Hanged at Launceston for the murder of Constable Tom Buckmaster at Avoca
Andrew Kelly – 26 April 1853 – Hanged at Launceston for the murder of Constable Tom Buckmaster at Avoca
Samuel Jacobs - 29 April 1853 - Hanged at Launceston for the rape of six-year-old Nathaniel Poole at Deloraine
Samuel Maberley - 18 May 1853 - Hanged at Hobart for the attempted murder of the Rev Dr Stephen Aldhouse in Church St
Francis McManus - 21 June 1853 - Hanged at Hobart for the rape of Elizabeth Roscoe on Bruny Island
Levi McAlister - 21 June 1853 - Hanged at Hobart for the rape of six-year-old Jane Hughes at Bridgewater
William Brown (alias Stockton) – 25 October 1853 – Hanged at Launceston for stabbing with intent to murder James Stephens
Ezra Cox - 27 June 1854 - Hanged at Hobart for the murder of Isaac Moulds at New Norfolk  
Thomas Kenney –  31 July 1854 – Hanged at Launceston for setting fire to a haystack at Kings Meadows
Thomas Hall - 31 July 1854 - Hanged at Launceston for the attempted murder of his wife Jane Hall at Table Cape
George Whiley – 3 November 1854 – Hanged at Launceston for the robbery and assault of James Smith near Westbury

1855 to 1859

Peter Connolly – 26 June 1855 – Bushranger. Hanged at Hobart for assault and robbery of William Kearney
John "Rocky" Whelan – 26 June 1855 – Bushranger. Confessed to five murders. Hanged at Hobart
Edward Heylin – 26 June 1855 – Hanged at Hobart for shooting with intent at Constable Robert Allison in Victoria St, Hobart
John Parsons Knights – 26 June 1855 – Hanged at Hobart for burglary of the house of Thomas Nicholson in Victoria St, Hobart
John Mellor - 19 Feb 1856 - Hanged at Hobart for bushranging and attempted murder of Hugh Simpson at St Peter's Pass, near York Plains
Thomas Rushton - 19 Feb 1856 - Hanged at Hobart for bushranging and attempted murder of Hugh Simpson at St Peter's Pass, near York Plains
Richard Rowley - 25 June 1856 - Hanged at Hobart for the rape of nine-year-old Isabelle Johnson in Brisbane St
Michael Casey – 5 August 1856 – Hanged at Oatlands for the attempted murder of John Hewitt at Falmouth
George Langridge - 19 September 1856 - Hanged at Hobart for the murder of his wife Jane Langridge at Richmond
John O'Neill - 19 September 1856 - Hanged at Hobart for assault and robbery of James Rowland at Constitution Dock
Anthony Clarke - 12 November 1856 - Hanged at Launceston for murder of John Kendall near Deloraine
Michael Barry (alias Moloney) - 25 November 1856 - Hanged at Hobart for the assault and robbery of Edward Adams at Old Beach
William Woolford - 25 November 1856 - Hanged at Hobart for the attempted murder of Constable William Burton at Port Arthur
George Nixon – 3 March 1857 - Hanged at Hobart for the murder of fourteen-year-old Henry Chamberlayne at Kingston
John Higgins - 12 August 1857 - Hanged at Launceston for the armed robbery of Henry Dales on the Evandale Road near Clairville
James Waldron - 12 August 1857 - Hanged at Launceston for the armed robbery of Henry Dales on the Evandale Road near Clairville
Alexander Cullen – 18 August 1857 – Hanged at Campbell Street Gaol for the murder of Betsy Ross in a house behind the Red Lion, Liverpool St
Abraham Munday – 27 October 1857 – Hanged at Oatlands for attempted murder by poison of George White at Courland Bay
Richard "Long Mick" Ennis – 27 October 1857 – Hanged at Oatlands for the murder of George Sturgeon at Kitty's Corner, near Antill Ponds
James Kelly – 28 November 1857 – Hanged at Campbell Street Gaol for the murder of Coleman O'Loughlin at Avoca
Timothy Kelly - 28 November 1857 - Hanged at Campbell Street Gaol for the murder of Coleman O'Loughlin at Avoca
William Maher – 28 November 1857 – Hanged at Campbell Street Gaol for the murder of his wife Catherine Maher at Brown's River, Kingborough
Thomas Callinan - 20 April 1858 - Hanged at Campbell Street Gaol for the murder of Amelia Murray at Three Hut Point
Henry Madigan – 5 May 1858 – Hanged at Launceston for the murder of his brother John Madigan at Prosser's Forest, Ravenswood
Matthew Burns (Breen) – 5 August 1858 – Hanged at Launceston for the rape of three-year-old Eliza MacDonald at Avoca
George Young – 5 August 1858 – Hanged at Launceston for the murder of Esther Scott in High Street Windmill Hill
Thomas Gault – 21 December 1858 – Hanged at Campbell Street Gaol for Felonious Assault and Robbery of John Duffy, Isabella Brown and Archibald Stacey at the Mount Nelson Signal Station
William Anderson - 31 January 1859 - Hanged at Launceston for the armed robbery of James Chapman at Distillery Creek
John McLaughlin - 31 January 1859 - Hanged at Launceston for the armed robbery of George Cooper on Westbury Road
William Gibson - 31 January 1859 - Hanged at Launceston for committing sodomy on ten-year-old Tom Gilligan on the road between Fingal and Avoca
John King – 16 February 1859 – Hanged at Campbell Street Gaol for the murder of Rebecca Hall at the Bull's Head, Goulburn Street
Peter Haley ("Black Peter") – 16 February 1859 – Bushranger. Hanged at Campbell Street Gaol for Shooting with Intent at Richard Propsting on the road between Ross and Tunbridge
Daniel ("Wingy") Stewart – 16 February 1859 – Bushranger. Hanged at Campbell Street Gaol for Shooting with Intent at Richard Propsting on the road between Ross and Tunbridge
William Ferns (alias Flowers) – 16 February 1859 – Bushranger. Hanged at Campbell Street Gaol for Shooting with Intent at Richard Propsting on the road between Ross and Tunbridge.
William Davis – 16 February 1859 – Hanged at Campbell Street Gaol for the murder of Andre Cassavant at Black River
Robert Brown – 4 May 1859 – Hanged at Campbell Street Gaol for the rape of a three-year-old at Triabunna
Bernard Donahue – 12 July 1859 – Hanged at Campbell Street Gaol for the murder of James Burton near Kingston

1860s

John Vigors – 31 January 1860 – Hanged at Oatlands for Shooting with Intent at John Baker at Ellerslie
Henry Baker - 7 February 1860 - Hanged at Launceston for the murder of Ellen Gibson at Sandhill
John Nash – 4 May 1860 – Hanged at Campbell Street Gaol for the murder of William Iles near Cleveland
Julius Baker – 10 May 1860 – Hanged at Campbell Street Gaol for shooting with intent at Port Arthur. Baker was a constable who took money from two prisoners Stretton and Donohue to assist their escape, he then shot them in their attempt
Michael Walsh - 29 May 1860 - Hanged at Launceston for the assault and rape of Eleanor Ward at Longford
Martin Lydon – 25 September 1860 – Hanged at Campbell Street Gaol for the rape of nine-year-old Hannah Norah Handley at Port Cygnet
Thomas Ross - 30 January 1861 - Hanged at Launceston for an 'unnatural crime' on a boy named William Saunders at Bishopsbourne
John Hailey – 23 May 1861 – Hanged at Launceston for the murder of William Wilson at Cullenswood
John Chapman – 23 May 1861 – Hanged at Launceston for assault with intent to murder Daniel Webb at Avoca
Patrick Maloney – 23 May 1861 – Hanged at Launceston for the murder of Richard Furlong at Evandale
Margaret Coghlan – 18 February 1862 – Hanged at Campbell Street Gaol for the murder of her husband John Coghlan in Goulburn St, Hobart, near the corner of Harrington St 
Charles Flanders - 24 June 1862 – Hanged at Campbell Street Gaol for the murder of ten-year-old Mary Ann Riley at Bagdad
William Mulligan – 18 November 1862 – Hanged at Campbell Street Gaol for the rape and robbery of Johanna Harrbach at Bagdad 
Hendrick Whitnalder – 20 February 1863 – (Described as a 'little Kaffir'). Hanged at Campbell Street Gaol for sodomy with fourteen-year-old Cornwall Collins (Collard)
Dennis Collins - 11 August 1863 - Hanged at Launceston for 'an unnatural crime' with seven-year-old Joseph Palmer 
Robert McKavor – 16 February 1864 – Hanged at Campbell Street Gaol for the felonious assault and robbery of Edward Coningsby on the Oatlands Road
James Lynch – 23 May 1865 – Hanged at Launceston for the rape of his ten-year-old step-daughter Cathy Nichols at Port Sorell
William Griffiths – 2 December 1865 – Hanged at Campbell Street Gaol for the murder of eight-year-old George and six-year-old Sarah Johnson at Glenorchy
Daniel "Little Dan" Connors – 17 March 1868 – Hanged at Launceston for the murder of Ellen Moriarty at Longford
Patrick Kiely - 17 November 1869 - Hanged at Launceston for the murder of his wife Bridget at Paddy's Scrub, Deloraine

1870s to 1940s

John Regan (46) – 28 June 1870 – Hanged at Launceston for the murder of his sixteen-year-old wife Emma on the Westbury Road
Job Smith (55) – 31 May 1875 – Hanged at Campbell Street Gaol for the rape of Margaret Ayres, the chaplain's housemaid, at Port Arthur
John Bishnahan (46) - 19 November 1877 - Hanged at Launceston for the murder of Thomas Rudge at Evandale
Richard Copping (19) – 21 October 1878 – Hanged at Campbell Street Gaol for the murder of Susannah Stacey at Bream Creek
George Braxton (60) – 10 July 1882 – Hanged at Launceston for the murder of Ellen Sneezwell in York Street
James Ogden (20) – 4 June 1883 – Hanged at Campbell Street Gaol for the murder of William Wilson at Cleveland
James Sutherland (18) – 4 June 1883 – Hanged at Campbell Street Gaol for the murder of William Wilson at Cleveland
Henry Stock (22) – 13 October 1884 – Hanged at Campbell Street Gaol for the murder of Elizabeth Kent and her daughter near Ouse
Timothy Walker (76) - 10 January 1887 - Hanged at Campbell Street Gaol for the murder of Benjamin Hamilton at Deloraine. Walker was the last transported convict to be executed in Tasmania. This was hangman Solomon Blay's last execution
Arthur Cooley (19) – 17 August 1891 – Hanged at Campbell Street Gaol for the murder of Mary Camille Ogilvy near Richmond
Joseph Belbin (19) – 11 March 1914 – Hanged at Campbell Street Gaol for the murder of Margaret Ledwell at Deloraine
George Carpenter (27) – 27 December 1922 – Murdered three people at Swansea. Hanged at Campbell Street Gaol for the murder of his cousin Thomas Carpenter
Frederick Thompson (32) - 14 February 1946 - Hanged at Campbell Street Gaol for the murder of eight year old Evelyn Maughan. The last person executed in Tasmania.

References

Further reading 
 Heaton, J.H. Australian Dictionary of Dates and Men of the Time, S.W. Silver & Son, London, 1879. Part 2, pages 90–94.

Australian crime-related lists
Executed
Australia
 
Executions
Executions
executed